Saint-Médard-en-Jalles is a commune in the Gironde department in Nouvelle-Aquitaine in southwestern France.

Located west-northwest of the city of Bordeaux, it is the fifth-largest suburb of the city and a member of the Bordeaux Métropole.

Population

See also
Communes of the Gironde department

References

External links

 Official website 

Communes of Gironde